FanGraphs.com is a website run by Fangraphs Inc., located in Arlington, Virginia, and created and owned by David Appelman that provides statistics for every player in Major League Baseball history.

On September 18, 2009, Fangraphs Inc. launched an iPhone app in partnership with Hawk Ridge Consulting, which has since been discontinued. Fangraphs has a number of content partners including ESPN, SB Nation and Fanhouse.

FanGraphs products
FanGraphs creates several products:

Web sites
 The FanGraphs homepage, which contains articles, statistical reports and also covers baseball history as well as current issues and events, including games and series, injuries, forecasts, player profiles, baseball finance, and the player marketplace.

 RotoGraphs is FanGraphs' fantasy baseball advice and analysis section. It originally featured David Golebiewski of ESPN Inside Edge, Marc Hulet, Brian Joura of newyorkmetsdaily.com, and Peter Bendix. Currently managed by Eno Sarris.
 NotGraphs provides "a place to put things that would otherwise not have a place on FanGraphs". NotGraphs was managed by Carson Cistulli but ceased publishing new content at the conclusion of the 2014 season.
 The Community Blog is an opportunity for readers to share their writing through FanGraphs.  In May 2010 an editorial staff was put in place to guarantee an "approval process" within 48 hours of submission.
 The FanGraphs Library is an encyclopedia of Sabermetric statistics and principles run by Neil Weinberg.

Publishing
 FanGraphs releases an annual book The FanGraphs Second Opinion: Fantasy Companion that contains statistics and analysis of the past season, in-depth player profiles, team previews, articles on fantasy strategy and forecasts of the upcoming season.

Podcasts
 Hosted by FanGraphs editor Meg Rowley, FanGraphs Audio is a weekly program archived at FanGraphs Audio.
Hosted by Ben Lindbergh and Meg Rowley, Effectively Wild is a thrice weekly podcast. Effectively Wild was initially created as a part of Baseball Prospectus, but moved over to FanGraphs at the beginning of 2017.

Fantasy Baseball
 FanGraphs works with Ottoneu baseball to offer a fantasy baseball program with prizes.

Regular writers

FanGraphs

 Carson Cistulli – Senior writer of FanGraphs, former editor of NotGraphs and host of the FanGraphs Audio podcast. Joined in August, 2009. Cistulli is responsible for the Daily Notes and writes the "Fringe Five" prospect feature. He previously worked for The Hardball Times.
 Paul Swydan – Senior writer of FanGraphs. Joined in January, 2011. Swydan is the co-managing editor of The Hardball Times and is a writer for ESPN Insider. He previously worked 7 years for the Colorado Rockies and wrote for Baseball Prospectus, MLB.com, Rockies Magazine and the Biz Of Baseball.
 Eric Longenhagen – FanGraphs lead prospect analyst. Contributed in 2014 and 2015, but re-joined in May, 2016. Longenhagen previously wrote for Crashburn Alley, Sports on Earth, Prospect Insider and ESPN.
 Chris Mitchell – Prospect analyst at FanGraphs and proprietor of the KATOH prospect projection system. Joined February, 2015. Mitchell also contributes to The Hardball Times, and has previously contributed to Pinstripe Alley and Pinstripe Pundits.
 Kiley McDaniel – Prospect analyst at Fangraphs. McDaniel previously worked as the Assistant Director of Baseball Operations with the Atlanta Braves, and for the New York Yankees, Pittsburgh Pirates and Baltimore Orioles and wrote for Scout.com and ESPN's Draft Blog.
 Craig Edwards – Staff writer of FanGraphs. Joined in February, 2015.
 Nathaniel Grow – Legal analyst at FanGraphs. Joined in December, 2014. Grow is an Associate Professor of Legal Studies at the University of Georgia's Terry College of Business. He is the author of Baseball on Trial: The Origin of Baseball's Antitrust Exemption, as well as a number of sports-related law review articles.
 Corinne Landrey  – Staff writer of FanGraphs. Joined in June, 2016. Landrey also writes for The Hardball Times, Today's Knuckleball and is the managing editor of Crashburn Alley.
 David Laurila – Staff writer of FanGraphs. Joined in May, 2011. Laurila contributes Q&A articles and produces the Sunday Notes column. He is a member of the BBWAA and previously wrote for Baseball Prospectus where he wrote the Prospectus Q&A from February 2006 until May 2011.
 Blake Murphy – Staff writer of FanGraphs and RotoGraphs. Joined in July, 2013. Murphy contributes to the Daily Fantasy feature at RotoGraphs. He also serves as the NBA editor for theScore Inc. and writes for NylonCalculus.com and RaptorsRepublic.com.
 David G. Temple – Staff writer of FanGraphs and NotGraphs. Joined FanGraphs in October, 2013. Temple began writing for NotGraphs in July, 2012. He also contributes to The Hardball Times and is the host of the Stealing Home podcast. He previously contributed to TheClassical.com and ThePlatoonAdvantage.com.
 Neil Weinberg – Site educator of FanGraphs. Joined in July, 2014. Weinberg hosts a weekly chat and is responsible for maintaining the FanGraphs statistical library. He also works as a managing editor for SB Nation's BeyondtheBoxscore and writes for The Hardball Times, Gammons Daily, TigsTown.com and NewEnglishD.com.
 Jeff Zimmerman – Staff writer of FanGraphs and RotoGraphs. Joined in March, 2010. Zimmerman is the expert on player health and contributes extensive work relating to player aging curves. He contributes the weekly MASH report feature to RotoGraphs. He is also the founder of BaseballHeatMaps.com and writes for SB Nation's RoyalsReview.

RotoGraphs

 Mike Axisa (Apr '10 - present)  – RotoGraphs staff writer.  Also writes for and co-founded River Ave. Blues, a Yankees blog.
 Michael Barr (Feb '11 - present)  – RotoGraphs and FanGraphs staff writer.
 Howard Bender (Feb '11 - present)  – Founder of The Fantasy Baseball Buzz, also a contributor to the 2011 Fantasy Baseball Guide magazine and ESPN Radio.
 Jason Catania (Mar '11 - present)  – Also writes for ESPN The Magazine and ESPN Insider.
 Ben Duronio (Jan '12 - present)  – Also writes for the Capitol Avenue Club, a Braves blog. Worked with ESPN Stats & Info Group.
 Erik Hahmann (Feb '11 - present)  – Previously wrote for Bloomberg Sports, also writes for DraysBay.
 Marc Hulet (Apr '08 - present) – Hulet provides articles and scouting reports on minor league prospects, including annual preseason and midseason top prospect lists.
 Brad Johnson (Oct '13 - present)– Johnson is responsible for The Daily Grind feature at RotoGraphs. Also occasionally contributes to The Hardball Times.
 Mike Podhorzer (Mar '11 - present)  – Has written for The Fantasy Baseball Generals and FantasyPros911.
 Zach Sanders (Nov '09 - present)  – RotoGraphs staff writer and creator of the Roto Riteup, a daily fantasy baseball column which runs through the duration of the MLB season. Sanders also contributes to RotoGraphs' Fantasy Rankings.
 Dan Wade (Aug '11 - present)  – RotoGraphs staff writer.
 Brandon Warne (Feb '12 - March '18)  - Covered two start starting pitchers for Rotographs. Warne is a Minnesota Twins beat reporter for Twin Cities-based website Access Twins.
 David Wiers (Mar '12 - present)  - RotoGraphs staff writer and co-author of the Roto Riteup series.

Former
 Dave Cameron – Was the managing editor and senior writer of FanGraphs. He hosted a weekly chat, contributed to FanGraphs on Fox Sports, wrote several features such as the annual "Trade Value" series and was a regular contributor to the FanGraphs Audio podcast. Cameron was the co-founder of USSMariner.com and previously worked for Baseball Prospectus and contributed to The Wall Street Journal. On January 10, 2018, Cameron announced that he would be leaving his job as managing editor in order to take up a job as an analyst for the San Diego Padres.
 Eno Sarris – Senior writer of FanGraphs and editor of RotoGraphs. Joined in July, 2010. Sarris hosted a weekly chat, contributed to FanGraphs on Fox Sports and NotGraphs and is the founder and operator of BeerGraphs. He also wrote for the Hardball Times and previously wrote for Bloomberg Sports and Amazin' Avenue
 RJ Anderson – Now writes for Baseball Prospectus.
 Patrick Andriola - Joined FanGraphs in June, 2010 until October, 2010  Before joining FanGraphs Andriola wrote for The Hardball Times (2009, 2010) and, as a student, worked for the Major League Baseball's Labor Relations Department.
Jeff Sullivan – On February 22, 2019, Sullivan announced he was leaving FanGraphs for a job with the Tampa Bay Rays of Major League Baseball. He was a senior writer of FanGraphs and editor of the Community blog.  Sullivan hosted a weekly chat, contributed to FanGraphs on Fox Sports, wrote several features, such as the "Worst of the Best" series and is a co-hosted of the "Effectively Wild" podcast. He also wrote for USSMariner.com and previously wrote for SB Nation's Lookout Landing.  
 Peter Bendix – Now works for the Tampa Bay Rays as an assistant of Baseball Research and Development.
 Drew Fairservice – Fairservice is the managing editor of GhostRunnerOnFirst.com and previously wrote for the theScore Inc.
 August Fagerstrom – Former staff writer of FanGraphs. Joined in June, 2014. Fagerstrom also writes for the Akron Beacon Journal and ohio.com and has been published in the Chicago Tribune and The Washington Post. August left FanGraphs at the end of the 2016 season to work for the Milwaukee Brewers.
 Sky Kalkman – Left FanGraphs in 2006, then wrote for Beyond The Boxscore, and now writes for Baseball Prospectus.
 Jonah Keri – Keri joined FanGraphs in January 2011, introduced as having "written for every publication known to man" -- Playboy, ESPN, and Baseball Prospectus among others, the author of The Extra 2%: How Wall Street Strategies Took a Major League Baseball Team from Worst to First (2011).  Keri was a staff writer for FanGraphs and NotGraphs until August 2011 when he left to write "full-time" at Grantland.com.
 Matt Klaassen – Joined in November, 2009 until November 2014. Klaassen was a staff writer and occasionally contributed to the FanGraphs Audio podcast.
 Erik Manning – Now writes for Beyond The Boxscore.
 Mike Petriello – Petriello now writes for MLB.com. He's also contributed to The Hardball Times, ESPN Insider and DodgersDigest.com. He was previously an editor producer for Sports on Earth.
 Frankie Piliere – Now writes for Scout.com.
 Bryan Smith - Wrote for FanGraphs from January, 2010 until November, 2010.
 Steve Sommer - Wrote for FanGraphs from March, 2010 until May 2010.  Now writes for The Hardball Times.
 Nathaniel Stoltz – Stoltz was a prospect writer who viewed prospects in the Eastern, Carolina, South Atlantic, and New York-Penn Leagues. He previously wrote at Beyond the Box Score, Athletics Nation, and RotoGraphs.
 JD Sussman –  Sussman was a prospect writer who contributed to the Prospect Watch feature. He previously wrote for BullpenBanter.com.
 Wendy Thurm – Thurm was a previous lawyer of 18 years who covered legal issues in baseball. She has previously contributed to Sports on Earth, ESPN, SB Nation, theScore Inc., BayAreaSportsGuy.com, TheClassical.com and San Francisco magazine.
 Bradley Woodrum – Woodrum holds degrees from Jacksonville University (B.A. Economics and B.A. English) and Roosevelt University (M.A. Economics). He also co-founded Cubs Stats and writes for DRaysBay and SBN Tampa Bay. He currently works for the Miami Marlins.

References

External links

 Svrluga, Barry, "The rise of FanGraphs: Stats site gives fans, front offices view to baseball's evolution," The Washington Post, 2/15/16 accessed 2/15/16
Seidman, Eric, "What's new at Fangraphs?," The Hardball Times, 1/16/09 accessed 8/24/09
Studeman, Dave, "Fangraphs going wild," The Hardball Times, 3/15/08, accessed 8/24/09
Anderson, Chuck, "Decoding Fangraphs: Hitting Stats," Fantastic Gameday, 8/24/09, accessed 8/24/09
Fangraphs App Description in iTunes App Store, 9/18/09, accessed 10/14/09

Major League Baseball websites
Baseball websites
Baseball statistics
American sport websites
Fantasy sports